Melbourne Sports Centres - MSAC is an international sporting venue located in Albert Park, Victoria, Australia. The centre was opened on 24 July 1997 at a construction cost of A$65 million. The cost was funded by the State Government of Victoria and the City of Port Phillip. The centre has hosted international events including the 2006 Commonwealth Games and the 2007 World Aquatics Championships.

The centre has several swimming pools and international standard diving facilities. There is a large multi-purpose sports hall used for sports such as badminton, basketball, table tennis and volleyball, and also squash courts and a gym.

It is one of four sporting facilities in Melbourne - the others being the State Netball and Hockey Centre (SNHC), the MSAC Institute of Training (MIT) and Lakeside Stadium - to be named under the banner of Melbourne Sports Centres, and is operated by the State Sports Centres Trust.

The centre is accessible by tram routes 12 and 96 which both pass near Southern Cross railway station and the Melbourne City Centre.

Construction

Stage 1
The first part of MSAC's construction was completed in 1997. This included the majority of the facilities currently at MSAC including the indoor pools and the sports hall.

Stage 2
In 2002, it was announced that MSAC would be expanded in time for the 2006 Commonwealth Games. A new hydrotherapy pool, a new 50 metre outdoor pool and improved transport links were some of the facilities added in the $51 million expansion. Work began on the Stage 2 project in September 2003. The expansion opened in early 2006. Since then, a movable floor was installed in the 50m outdoor pool which allows the water depth to be varied.

Facilities
The centre boasts numerous facilities.

Aquatics
 Indoor 50m pool
 25m lap pool
 Multi-purpose pool
 Hydrotherapy pool
 Outdoor 50m pool
 Wave pool
 Diving boards
 Water slide dismantled as at 31 Dec 2019

Sport
 10 indoor basketball courts
 10 squash courts
 12 badminton courts
 18 table tennis tables
 3 volleyball courts

National Basketball League club Melbourne United have been based at the centre since the start of the 2018/19. The team trains in the basketball precinct, which features an 1800-seat show court, and have their club offices and facilities located in the centre.

Events
MSAC regularly hosts many events including state and national championships. Among the major events MSAC has hosted are:
 2001 Women's World Open Squash Championship
 2005 Summer Deaflympics
 2006 Commonwealth Games - squash, diving, swimming, table tennis
 2007 FINA World Swimming Championships - diving, water polo
 2007 and 2008 Australian Club Championships
 NBL games for Victoria Giants
 2022 FINA World Swimming Championships (25 m)

Charlene Wittstock, the future Princess of Monaco, won a gold medal for South Africa in the 2002 World Cup held at MSAC. She returned to the MSAC on a royal visit to Melbourne in March 2012.

External links
Melbourne Sports Centres - MSAC official website

References

Sports venues in Melbourne
Swimming venues in Australia
Basketball venues in Australia
Defunct National Basketball League (Australia) venues
2006 Commonwealth Games venues
Sports venues in Victoria (Australia)
Badminton venues
Commonwealth Games swimming venues
Netball venues in Victoria (Australia)
Sport in the City of Port Phillip
Sports venues completed in 1997
1997 establishments in Australia
Buildings and structures in the City of Port Phillip
Swimming at the 2006 Commonwealth Games
Diving at the 2006 Commonwealth Games
Water polo venues in Australia